Chittenden & Eastman Company (established in 1866) is an American handcrafting mattress manufacturer originally based in Burlington, Iowa. The company has thirty factories around the world and is currently headquartered in North Brunswick, New Jersey.  Chittenden & Eastman's intellectual property has since been purchased by Mattress Development Company of Delaware which reintroduced the Eastman House brand into the marketplace.  The company is active with over 30 factories and licensees worldwide.

Eastman House has licensees in the following countries:  Australia, Bahrain, Brazil, Canada, China, Egypt, Guatemala, India, Indonesia, Iraq, Jordan, Korea, Kuwait, Lebanon, Malaysia, New Zealand, Omen, Pakistan, Philippines, Qatar, Russia, Saudi Arabia, Singapore, Syria, Taiwan, Thailand, Turkey, UAE, Ukraine, United States, Vietnam, Yemen.



Company history

 Chittenden & Eastman Company was founded by G.M. Todd and H. Bailey in 1866.
 In 1972, Company moves its mattress manufacturing operations to a 90,000-square-foot facility in Roosevelt Avenue and 170,000-square-foot added to it in 1975.
 In 1993, Company expands its business to New York and New England markets.
 In 1994, Chittenden & Eastman Company acquired Aireloom Bedding.
 In 1995, Chittenden & Eastman signed to manufacturer Dormir Sleep Products.
 In 2003, Chittenden & Eastman relocated production to Missouri.
 In 2007, Chittenden & Eastman's intellectual property was purchased by Mattress Development Company of Delaware which reintroduced the Eastman House brand into the marketplace.
 In 2008, Eastman House Company added Houston-based Sanitary Mattress as a licensee.
 In 2009, Eastman House Company added Australia based company A.H. Beard as a licensee.
 In 2011, Eastman House Company added Canada based company Vogue Bedding as a licensee.
 In 2014, Matthew Connolly was appointed as president of the company.
 In 2015 (March), Eclipse and Eastman House mattress brand enter Guatemala
 In April 2015, Saudi Arabia's Almutlaq Group licenses Eastman House Mattress Brand
 In April 2015, Spears family of Heritage Sleep Products open new plant selling Eastman House and Eclipse mattresses.
 In 2015, Illinois Sleep Products signed agreement to produce mattresses under Eastman House mattress brands.
 In 2015, Eastman House company donates mattresses for the Pope Francis entourage to Philadelphia.

References

External links 
 Official website

Companies established in 1866
Mattress retailers of the United States